The Secret Life of Bees may refer to:

 The Secret Life of Bees (novel), a 2001 novel by Sue Monk Kidd
 The Secret Life of Bees (film), a 2008 film based on the novel